The 1999–2000 Cypriot Second Division was the 45th season of the Cypriot second-level football league. Digenis won their 2nd title.

Format
Fourteen teams participated in the 1999–2000 Cypriot Second Division. All teams played against each other twice, once at their home and once away. The team with the most points at the end of the season crowned champions. The first three teams were promoted to 2000–01 Cypriot First Division and the last three teams were relegated to the 2000–01 Cypriot Third Division. However, in the summer, after the end of the championship, Evagoras Paphos merged with APOP Paphos to form AEP Paphos (AEP took the place of APOP to 2000–01 Cypriot First Division). Because of this, playoff matches were played between the bottom three teams of 1999–2000 Cypriot Second Division and the fourth team of 1999–2000 Cypriot Third Division (ASIL Lysi), for the extra place in 2000–01 Cypriot Second Division.

Changes from previous season
Teams promoted to 1999–2000 Cypriot First Division
 Anagennisi Deryneia
 Ethnikos Assia
 APOP

Teams relegated from 1998–99 Cypriot First Division
 Evagoras Paphos
 Doxa Katokopias
 Aris Limassol

Teams promoted from 1998–99 Cypriot Third Division
 Chalkanoras Idaliou
 Iraklis Gerolakkou
 APEP

Teams relegated to 1999–2000 Cypriot Third Division
 Rotsidis Mammari
 ASIL Lysi
 Akritas Chlorakas

League standings

Results

Relegation play-offs

See also
 Cypriot Second Division
 1999–2000 Cypriot First Division
 1999–2000 Cypriot Cup

Sources

Cypriot Second Division seasons
Cyprus
1999–2000 in Cypriot football